I'll Never Forget You may refer to:

I'll Never Forget You, 1951 U.S. film from 20th Century Fox, also known under its British title, The House in the Square
"I'll Never Forget You", song by American punk rock band, Hüsker Dü, from their 1984 album, Zen Arcade
I'll Never Forget You, also released as I Won't Forget You, 1999 album and song by Spanish pop/dance singer, Princessa.
"I'll Never Forget You", song by Francis and the Lights from their EP Striking, covered by Birdy on her self-titled album Birdy.

See also
Never Forget (disambiguation)
Never Forget You (disambiguation)